René Cardona Jr. (11 May 1939 – 5 February 2003) was a Mexican filmmaker and actor, son of Mexican director René Cardona, and the father of René Cardona III (also an actor and director).

Biography
Cardona Jr. began by acting in his father's films and then took over his father's craft in the mid-1960s, directing, writing, and producing over a hundred films over the years. He enjoyed some notoriety and success, particularly in the late 1970s, as a result of his Jaws-inspired film Tintorera (1977), which became a cult classic.

He capitalized on the spirit of cooperation between the Mexican, Spanish, and Italian film industries prevalent in the late 1970s and was able to make a spate of comparatively large-budget exploitation films with professional international casts and crews. He also managed to hire several once-popular American actors during this period, such as Joseph Cotten, John Huston, Gene Barry, Stuart Whitman, John Ireland, Arthur Kennedy, and Lionel Stander to help boost international ticket sales. Most of these actors were fresh from similar guest appearances in Italian films of the same period.

This brief period of international success waned in the mid-1980s, and he went back to Spanish-language Mexican "B-films" for the next few decades up to his death. He commonly worked with either Mexican leading man Hugo Stiglitz or Andrés García, who both briefly enjoyed some international fame while regulars in Cardona Jr. films.

Genres
He dabbled in a variety of genres, touching everything from disaster movies such as Cyclone (1978) to horror films (Night of a Thousand Cats in 1972), sci-fi films (The Bermuda Triangle in 1978), and even sensational dramas of historic events as the Jonestown Massacre, as retold as Guyana: Crime of the Century (1979).

Cardona Jr. is particularly infamous for his predilection for cruelty towards animals while filming. A live shark was killed during the filming of Tintorera, a cat was thrown over a wall in Night of a Thousand Cats, and live birds were thrown through windows to film the bird attack scenes in Beaks: The Movie (1987).

Selected filmography
 Buenos días Acapulco (1963)
 Juan Pistolas (1966)
 Dos pintores pintorescos (1967)
 Un par de robachicos (1967)
 El ojo de vidrio (1969)
 Vuelve el ojo de vidrio (1970)
 Blood Feast (1972)
 El valle de los miserables (1975)
 Tintorera (1977)
 King of the Gorillas (1977) aka The Gorilla Kid
 The Bermuda Triangle (1978)
 Cyclone (1978)
 Guyana: Crime of the Century (1979)
 Spicy Chile (1983)
 Fiebre de amor (1985)
 Escápate conmigo (1987)
 Beaks: The Movie (1987)
 Pero sigo siendo el rey (1988)
 Deliciosa Sinvergüenza (1990)
 Historias y testigos: ¡Ni una muerta más! (TV film, 2004)

References

External links

1939 births
2003 deaths
Male actors from Mexico City
Mexican male film actors
Mexican film directors